Telecommunications for Disaster Relief (TDR) is a proposal by the International Telecommunication Union to establish worldwide standards of interoperability and availability of emergency communications. The notion of establishing such standards was spurred in part by the 2004 Indian Ocean earthquake and tsunami which devastated Indonesia. 

The ITU assigned country code +888 for TDR, administered by the United Nations Office for the Coordination of Humanitarian Affairs. Numbers were assigned for the duration of a particular relief activity only, and could be reused for a future event. However, country code +888 was withdrawn from service and is now officially marked as “returned to spare.”

References

External links
ITU-T Workshop on Telecommunications for Disaster Relief, 2003
ITU-T Action Plan for Standardization on Telecommunications for Disaster Relief and Early Warning (TDR/EW), 2005
ITU-T Newslog Telecommunications for Disaster Relief (TDR)

Disaster preparedness
Emergency communication